In the geologic timescale, the Bajocian is an age and stage in the Middle Jurassic. It lasted from approximately 170.3 Ma to around 168.3 Ma (million years ago). The Bajocian Age succeeds the Aalenian Age and precedes the Bathonian Age.

Stratigraphic definitions
The Bajocian Stage takes its name from the Latin name (Bajocae) of the town of Bayeux, in the region of Normandy in France. The stage was named and introduced in scientific literature by French palaeontologist Alcide d'Orbigny in 1842.

The base of the Bajocian stage is defined as the place in the stratigraphic column where fossils of the ammonite genus Hyperlioceras first appear. A global reference profile (a GSSP) for the base is located at Murtinheira, close to Cabo Mondego in Portugal. The top of the Bajocian (the base of the Bathonian) is at the first appearance of ammonite species Parkinsonia convergens.

Subdivision
The Bajocian is often divided into Lower/Early and Upper/Late subages or substages.

In the Tethys domain, the Bajocian contains seven ammonite biozones:
zone of Parkinsonia parkinsoni
zone of Garantiana garantiana
zone of Strenoceras niortense
zone of Stephanoceras humphriesianum
zone of Sonninia propinquans
zone of Witchellia laeviuscula
zone of Hyperlioceras discites

References

Notes

Literature
; 2004: A Geologic Time Scale 2004, Cambridge University Press.
; 1842: Paléontologie française. 1. Terrains oolitiques ou jurassiques, 642 pp., Bertrand, Paris.
; 1997: Definition of the Aalenian-Bajocian Stage boundary, Episodes, 20(1): pp 16–22.
; 2002: A compendium of fossil marine animal genera (entry on cephalopoda), Bulletins of American Paleontology 364, p 560.

External links

GeoWhen Database - Bajocian
Jurassic-Cretaceous and Lower Jurassic timescales, at the website of the subcommission for stratigraphic information of the ICS
Stratigraphic chart of the Upper Jurassic, at the website of Norges Network of offshore records of geology and stratigraphy

 
02
Geological ages